The 1996 Brazilian Grand Prix was a Formula One motor race held at Interlagos, São Paulo on 31 March 1996. It was the second race of the 1996 Formula One World Championship.

The 71-lap race took place in heavy rain, and was won from pole position by Damon Hill, driving a Williams-Renault, with Jean Alesi second in a Benetton-Renault and Michael Schumacher third in a Ferrari.

Race summary

Two local drivers, Tarso Marques (in his début race) and Pedro Diniz, had their qualifying times disallowed for, respectively, a push-start and missing a weight check. However, they were allowed to start from the back of the grid.

Johnny Herbert started from the pit lane after switching to the backup-car due to electrical problems.

Damon Hill, who loved driving in the rain, took the lead and won the race under these difficult conditions with a comfortable winning margin of 17 seconds. São Paulo saw the 15th GP victory of Damon Hill, who thereby outperformed a record established by his father Graham Hill, who had won 14 races.

Major battles in the race were going on between Barrichello and Alesi, Alesi and Villeneuve, Schumacher and Frentzen and Schumacher and Barrichello.

Barrichello, who had qualified as second, lost ground to Villeneuve and Alesi on the first lap, but he kept sticking to the back of the Benetton and attempted to overtake Alesi three times in the early stages of the race, outbraking him into the first corner only to slide wide on the exit allowing Alesi back through.

After a while, Alesi picked up pace and began to harry Villeneuve for 2nd place. After a battle Villeneuve eventually succumbed to the pressure and spun off. Approaching half-distance, Alesi had a brief off track excursion which finally allowed Barrichello through into 2nd place. However, Barrichello was forced to make what was supposed to be his only fuel stop on lap 35, when the track was still too wet for slick tyres. Alesi, on the other hand, did not have to pit until lap 42, by which time the track was dry enough to switch to slick tyres. This forced Barrichello to make unscheduled pit stop to make the switch to slicks, dropping him back behind Alesi.

To compound his misfortune, Barrichello made the switch too late, three laps later than Schumacher, meaning that he also dropped behind the German when he finally made his stop. With a clearly faster car, Barrichello began to harry Schumacher for the final podium spot. However, the German would not give in and eventually he braked too late and spun off into the gravel at the end of the back straight.

Gerhard Berger had to park his Benetton in the pits after 27 laps. The Austrian had difficulties during qualifying which he could not explain. When the race then started under wet conditions, Berger had to drive carefully because he had never before piloted the Benetton in the rain. Not too unsatisfied with his performance, Berger experienced cut-offs due to hydraulic problems which became worse and worse and finally forced the car back to the garage.

Classification

Qualifying

 Herbert started at the pit lane after switching to his spare car.
 Diniz and Marques had their times deleted after receiving outside assistance, but were allowed to start at the back of the grid.

Race

Championship standings after the race

Drivers' Championship standings

Constructors' Championship standings

References

Brazilian Grand Prix
Brazilian Grand Prix
Grand Prix
Brazilian Grand Prix